Benson is an unincorporated community in Harford County, Maryland, United States. Benson has a post office with ZIP code 21018  and is served by the Area Codes 410, 443 and 667.

History 
The unincorporated community of Benson was shown to have a population of 42 people in 1895 with a functioning Post Office but no railroad services according to the Rand McNally Atlas.

References 

Unincorporated communities in Harford County, Maryland
Unincorporated communities in Maryland